The 1983 Major League Baseball season was the  seventh season in the history of the Seattle Mariners.

In his third season as the Mariners' manager, Rene Lachemann was fired on June 25, succeeded by Del Crandall. A former major league manager, Crandall was managing the Triple-A Albuquerque Dukes, the Pacific Coast League affiliate of the Los Angeles Dodgers.

Offseason 
 December 9, 1982: Rich Bordi was traded to the Chicago Cubs for Steve Henderson.
 January 20, 1983: Danny Tartabull was chosen from the Cincinnati Reds as a free agent compensation pick.
 January 27, 1983: Vance McHenry was traded to the Texas Rangers for Bob Babcock.
 January 28, 1983: Mike Hart was released.
 March 28, 1983: Bobby Brown was released.
 March 31, 1983: Ken Phelps was purchased from the Montreal Expos.

Regular season

Season standings

Record vs. opponents

Notable transactions 
 April 4 – Clint Hurdle was released.
 May 31 – Bob Long was signed as a free agent.
 June 27 – Gaylord Perry was released.
 June 30 – Todd Cruz was purchased by the Baltimore Orioles.

Roster

Player stats

Batting

Starters by position 
Note: Pos = Position; G = Games played; AB = At bats; H = Hits; Avg. = Batting average; HR = Home runs; RBI = Runs batted in

Other batters 
Note: G = Games played; AB = At bats; H = Hits; Avg. = Batting average; HR = Home runs; RBI = Runs batted in

Pitching

Starting pitchers 
Note: G = Games pitched; IP = Innings pitched; W = Wins; L = Losses; ERA = Earned run average; SO = Strikeouts

Other pitchers 
Note: G = Games pitched; IP = Innings pitched; W = Wins; L = Losses; ERA = Earned run average; SO = Strikeouts

Relief pitchers 
Note: G = Games pitched; W = Wins; L = Losses; SV = Saves; ERA = Earned run average; SO = Strikeouts

Farm system

Notes

References 
1983 Seattle Mariners at Baseball Reference
1983 Seattle Mariners team page at www.baseball-almanac.com

Seattle Mariners seasons
Seattle Mariners season
Seattle Mariners